Booneville High School is a comprehensive public secondary school located in Booneville, Arkansas, United States, for students in grades nine through twelve. Booneville is one of four public high schools in Logan County and the only high school administered by the Booneville School District.

Academics

Curriculum 
The assumed course of study for students is to complete the Smart Core curriculum developed by the Arkansas Department of Education (ADE), which requires students complete at least 22 units for graduation. Course offerings include regular and advanced placement classes and exams with opportunities for college credit via AP exam or via concurrent credit at University of Arkansas Community College at Morrilton and Arkansas Tech University. The school is accredited by the ADE.

Fine arts 
Students may participate in various musical and performing arts including art club, band (e.g., concert band, jazz band), choir, and theater.

Athletics 
The Booneville High School mascot is the Bearcat with the school colors of purple and old gold.

For the 2012–14 seasons, the Booneville Bearcats participate in the 4A Region 4 Conference. Competition is primarily sanctioned by the Arkansas Activities Association with students competing in American football, volleyball, baseball, basketball (boys and girls), competitive cheer, golf (boys and girls), softball, tennis (boys and girls), track and field (boys and girls).

Booneville returned to Class 4A for the 2016-18 cycle.

Controversy 
The school achieved a brief stint of internet fame in February, 2018, after a video of a fight, allegedly involving students from Booneville, went viral on social media. It was later revealed that the circumstances behind the video were blown out of proportion by numerous fake news outlets: the two individuals involved were cousins and had later reconciled.

Notable alumni 
 Kimberly Foster — actress
 Floyd Speer — professional baseball player

References

External links
 

Public high schools in Arkansas
Schools in Logan County, Arkansas
2011 establishments in Arkansas